This is a list of writers on Buddhism. The list is intended to include only those writers who have written books about Buddhism, and about whom there is already a Wikipedia article.  Each entry needs to indicate the writer's most well-known work. Multiple works should be listed only if each work already has a Wikipedia article.

Early Buddhism

Early Buddhism is the oldest Buddhism, before the split into several sects. The only surviving school is Theravada. Early Buddhism is still being studied by scholars.

 Y. Karunadasa
 Hajime Nakamura
 C. A. F. Rhys Davids
 T. W. Rhys Davids
 A. K. Warder

Theravada Buddhism

Other Theravada writers

 Ajahn Amaro
 Bhikkhu Analayo
 Bhadant Anand Kausalyayan
 Ananda Metteyya
 Balangoda Ananda Maitreya Thero
 B. R. Ambedkar
 Sayagyi U Ba Khin
 Samanera Bodhesako
 Bhikkhu Bodhi
 Ajahn Brahmavamso
 Buddhādasa Bhikkhu
 Acharya Buddharakkhita
 Ajahn Candasiri
 Ven. K. Sri Dhammananda
 Anagarika Dharmapala
 Ernest Reinhold Rost
 Frank Lee Woodward
 S. N. Goenka
 Hammalawa Saddhatissa
 Henepola Gunaratana
 Henry Steel Olcott
 Jack Kornfield
 Ajahn Jayasāro
 Joseph Goldstein
 Katukurunde Nyanananda Thera
 Ayya Khema
 Ledi Sayadaw
 Ajahn Lee
 Mahasi Sayadaw
 Matara Sri Nanarama Mahathera
 Nanamoli Bhikkhu
 Nanavira Thera
 Narada Maha Thera
 Nyanatiloka Mahathera
 Nyanaponika Thera
 Pa-Auk Sayadaw
 Phra Paisal Visalo
 Sayadaw U Pandita
 Ajahn Pasanno
 Paul Dahlke
 Prayudh Payutto
 Piyadassi Maha Thera
 Rahul Sankrityayan
 Rerukane Chandawimala Thero
 Sayadaw U Rewata Dhamma
 Sharon Salzberg
 Sīlācāra
 U Sīlānanda
 Achan Sobin S. Namto
 Soma Thera
 Stephen T. Asma
 Sylvia Boorstein
 Ajahn Sucitto
 Ajahn Sumedho
 Bhante Sujato
 Sujiva
 Ajahn Sundara
 Thanissaro Bhikkhu
 Sayadaw U Thittila
 Sister Vajirā
 Bhante Vimalaramsi
 Ajahn Viradhammo
 Walpola Rahula
 Webu Sayadaw
 R. G. de S. Wettimuny
 Yuttadhammo Bhikkhu

Politics
B. R. Ambedkar, religious Leader, jurist, political leader, Buddhist activist, philosopher, thinker, anthropologist, historian, orator, writer, economist, scholar, editor, revolutionary and the revivalist of Buddhism in India. He was also the chief architect of the Indian Constitution. 
Aung San Suu Kyi, political activist

Scholars
 Ashin Nandamalabhivamsa
 Benimadhab Barua
 David Kalupahana
 K.L. Dhammajoti
 K.N. Jayatilleke
 Karl Eugen Neumann
 Isaline Blew Horner
 L. S. Cousins
 Mingun Sayadaw
 P.D. Premasiri
 Polwatte Buddhadatta Thera
 Rajguru Aggavamsa Mahathera
 Rerukane Chandawimala Thero
 Richard Gombrich
 Robert Chalmers, 1st Baron Chalmers
 Rupert Gethin
 List of Sāsana Azani recipients, Buddhist monks who have successfully passed the Tipiṭakadhara (oral) and Tipiṭakakovida (written) examinations in Myanmar and only fifteen monks have been recognized as "Sāsana Azani".

Mahayana Buddhism

Although Mahayana Buddhism is virtually extinct in India, its philosophical systems, namely the Madhyamaka and Yogacara are still being studied.

Chán/Zen

Teachers

 Reb Anderson
 Taisen Deshimaru
 Norman Fischer
 Gil Fronsdal
 Steve Hagen
 Hsuan Hua
 Nan Huai-Chin
 Philip Kapleau
 Dainin Katagiri
 Long Gen
 Taizan Maezumi
 Thich Nhat Hanh
 Kitaro Nishida
 Shohaku Okumura
 Paul Reps
 Seung Sahn
 Seongcheol
 Sheng-yen
 Brad Warner
 Alan Watts
 Hsing Yun
 Han Yong-un
 Hakuun Yasutani
 Peter Levitt

Scholars
 Edward Conze
 Nishitani Keiji, Japanese philosopher
 Nishida Kitaro, Japanese philosopher
 Red Pine
 D.T. Suzuki, Japanese scholar
 Theodore Stcherbatsky, Russian, wrote Buddhist Logic
 Stephen F. Teiser

Other
 Alan Watts, American philosopher and lecturer

Humanistic Buddhism (China)

 Taixu
 Yin Shun

Nichiren Buddhism (Japan)

 Tanaka Chigaku
 Daisaku Ikeda
 Nikkyo Niwano

Vajrayana Buddhism

Vajrayana originated as Tantra in India.

Tibetan Buddhism

Vajrayana was introduced in Tibet, preferring Indian Buddhism over Chinese Buddhism, where it still survives.

Religious writers

 Pema Chödrön
 Dalai Lama
 Anagarika Govinda
 Kelsang Gyatso
 Khyentse Norbu
 Namkhai Norbu
 Thinley Norbu
 Ole Nydahl
 Matthieu Ricard
 Sangharakshita
 Sogyal Rinpoche
 Surya Das
 Thrangu Rinpoche
 Chögyam Trungpa

Scholars

 Alexander Berzin
 Lokesh Chandra
 Alexandra David-Néel
 Walter Evans-Wentz
 Christmas Humphreys
 Robert Thurman
 Donald S. Lopez Jr.

Navayana Buddhism

 B. R. Ambedkar
 Damodar Dharmananda Kosambi
 Iyothee Thass
 Shanti Swaroop Baudh

Western Buddhism

 Gil Fronsdal
 Stephen Batchelor
 David Brazier
 Mark Epstein
 Vidyamala Burch

Writers of fiction and literature
Matsuo Bashō, Japanese poet and journalist
Jack Kerouac, US poet and novelist
Tom Lowenstein, English poet, cultural historian and translator
Peter Matthiessen, US novelist
Ruth Ozeki, US novelist
Jess Row, short story writer
Gary Snyder, US poet
Allen Ginsberg, US poet

Writing instructors
Natalie Goldberg

See also
Access to Insight
Buddhist Cultural Centre
Buddhist Publication Society
Dhamma Society Fund
Dharma Seed
Pali Text Society
Pariyatti (bookstore)
List of Buddhists
List of modern scholars in Buddhist studies

References

 
Lists of writers